Where Were U In '92? is the debut studio album by British electronic producer Zomby, released in 2008 by Werk Discs.

The album's title refers to the opening line from the M.I.A. song "XR2" and is a homage to the rave scene of the early 1990s, reflected by Zomby's mixture of his usual chiptune-inflected UK garage style with the more upbeat, rave stylings of breakbeat house. Zomby used equipment from the period, such as the Akai S2000 sampler and Atari ST computer.

Track listing

References

2008 debut albums
Dubstep albums
Werk Discs albums
Zomby albums